Hungerford is a hamlet in the New Forest National Park of Hampshire, England. Its nearest town is Fordingbridge, which lies approximately 2 miles (3.4 km) north-west of the village.

Hungerford is a hamlet in the civil parish of Hyde, and it is located just to the south of the village of Hyde. With just 11 dwellings, Hungerford is the smallest hamlet in the parish. Hungerford is notable for its triangular village green bordered by two white thatched cottages, a cob farmhouse, and a traditional cottage. A country house built in 1927 is situated on the southern edge of the hamlet.

References

Hamlets in Hampshire
New Forest